Roja Dove (born Roger Bird, 25 September 1956) is a British perfumer whose fragrances are sold at department stores worldwide. Born and raised in Sussex, South East England, his career in perfumery began in 1981 when he joined the French perfume house Guerlain, working there for 20 years before leaving to set up his own companies RDPR and then Roja Parfums.

Early life
Dove's interest in fragrance was sparked at an early age when his mother kissed him goodnight; as she lowered her head to kiss him, he was aware that her fragrance lingered in his room long after she had gone, keeping the image of her cocktail dress and the kiss alive. This interest developed whilst Dove grew up, as a teenager he spent his money purchasing small bottles of scent and was impressed that the tiny containers could contain such an overwhelming effect.

Following his school days, Dove went up to University of Cambridge to study medicine. Whilst studying there he celebrated his 21st birthday with a visit to the Guerlain Boutique on the Champs-Elysées. It was then that he started working at Joshua Taylor’s, a Cambridge department store. He worked in the male fashion boutique of Taylor’s known as the Peacock. Following this, Dove dropped out of university to pursue a career in perfumery and with Guerlain.

Time at Guerlain
In Dove's enthusiasm for learning more following his trip to the Guerlain boutique, he frequently wrote to classic French perfumers requesting information and experience.  Eventually, pestered but impressed by Dove's interest, Robert Guerlain offered him a position.  In 1981 Dove was recruited into the Training and Public Relations Department where he began to consolidate a professional understanding for the industry. Dove remained with Guerlain for nearly 20 years; after a number of years he was given the position of Global Ambassador, the first non-Guerlain family member to be given the role. He was dubbed "Professeur de Parfum".

RDPR Limited
After two decades with Guerlain, Dove left the house to set up his own public relations firm RDPR Limited, with a head office based in his hometown of Brighton.

The Roja Dove Haute Parfumerie
In 2004 the Roja Dove Haute Parfumerie opened on the sixth floor of Harrods in conjunction with Urban Retreat. "Physically, it is going to be a sensual haven… Silks and satins, lots of glass, mirror and crystal, as well as the black lacquer, give the salon the air of an exotic boudoir".

Since it opened in 2004 the Haute Parfumerie has stocked scents from many famous and unfamiliar brands including Tom Ford, Caron, Lalique, Xerjoff, Dior, Atelier Flou, Clive Christian, and Grossmith.

Dove received requests from customers to smell ‘Roja Dove’ creations. Previously, in 2002, Dove joined names like Manolo Blahnik in donating prizes for the annual Terrence Higgins Trust fundraiser, the perfumer created a bespoke scent for the highest bidder contained within a Baccarat crystal presentation bottle.  In 2005, Dove drew inspiration from this event and created a range of semi-bespoke fragrances for customers of the Haute Parfumerie to purchase; however these scents come without bottles, names, and with only enough liquid to make 50 of each.

Other work
Within the perfume industry itself, Dove has been actively involved with The Fragrance Foundation, The Jasmine Awards and The Cosmetics Perfumer Retailers Association.

Dove has written for a range of titles including Vogue, The Times, Vanity Fair, and Wallpaper on subjects such as perfume, celebrity fragrances, classic favorites, or even the ‘Smells of London’.
    
Dove has also given lectures and spoken at charity events for The Barbican, The Science Museum, and the Museum of Fine Arts, Boston. In 2010 Dove worked closely with the Victoria and Albert Museum for their exhibition Diaghilev and the Golden Age of the Ballets Russes, which ran from 25 September 2010 to 9 January 2011, where he created an accompanying fragrance named ‘Diaghilev’ and gave an evening lecture upon 1920s Parisian society and perfume.

With regards to new initiatives, in 2007 Dove teamed up with BA Highlife Shop, the British Airways onboard retail publication for duty-free products, as their regular fragrance expert. Then in 2009 Dove began to work with World Duty Free to create an online resource to help the user discover their ideal scent; www.discoverfragrance.com (currently out of business). Shortly after Dove collaborated with The Macallan Scottish whiskey house where the perfumer created a new way of experiencing whiskey; using an odour profiling technique referred to now as The Macallan Aroma Box.

List of collaborations
2005, Hardy Amies, Hardy Amies
2006, Kelly Hoppen Candle
2009, 6, Pierre de Velay
2009, 11, Pierre de Velay
2009, 23, Pierre de Velay
2010, Blessings, Belinda Brown
2010, M, Puredistance
2010, Buzz, The Sun
2010, Diaghilev, The Victoria and Albert Museum
2011, Four Seasons Amenities, Four Seasons Park Lane London

Roja Parfums
Following on from his bespoke fragrance experience Dove decided to present his own fragrance range. Initially referred to as ‘The Trilogy’, Dove created a scent for each female fragrance family; Oriental, Chypre, and Floral, entitled ‘Enslaved, Unspoken, and Scandal’ accordingly.

In 2011, the existing Roja Dove line became Roja Parfums. Simultaneously, following two years of research, the first Roja Parfums candle 'Neroli' was released. The same year Roja Parfums was introduced to the Black Hall Perfumery in Harrods, alongside fragrance houses such as Chanel.

References

External links
 Roja Parfums official website
 Unilever won a judgement against the trademark "ROJA DOVE" due to their trademark "DOVE"

Perfumers
Living people
1957 births
People from Sussex